The Natural Gas Revenue Fund (NGRF) is the proposed sovereign wealth fund of Tanzania expected to be launched in October 2014 or February 2015 after the enactment of a bill by the National Assembly. It will manage the revenue accrued from the sale of its natural gas. As of April 2014, Tanzania has a recoverable gas reserve of 43.1 tcf. The fund will be managed by the Bank of Tanzania. However, according to PFC Energy, 25 to 30 trillion cubic feet of recoverable natural gas resources have been discovered in Tanzania since 2010.

See also
 Economy of Tanzania

References

External links
 THE NATIONAL NATURAL GAS POLICY OF TANZANIA - 2013
 Editorial: Sovereign Wealth Fund a well thought idea

Government of Tanzania
Sovereign wealth funds